Roy "Reno" Wilson (born January 20, 1969) is an American actor. He is best known for his role as Howard in the sitcom The Cosby Show, Officer Carl McMillan in Mike & Molly and Stan Hill in Good Girls, Wes in The Chronicle (2001–2002), and as Detective Tom Selway in Blind Justice (2005). He is also known for providing character voices in the Transformers film series, Bailey in She Creature (2001), and Louis Armstrong in Bolden (2019).

Career
Wilson has appeared in a number of television programs and films. His first television role was on the NBC's The Cosby Show, where (on a recurring basis) he portrayed Theo Huxtable's college friend Howard during Seasons 5 and 6 of the series. His most recent film roles were that of Orlando in Crank and Crank: High Voltage. He was also a main cast member on the CBS sitcom Mike & Molly (Wilson frequently works with good friend and fellow actor Billy Gardell), and has also acted in Prison Break. Wilson is known as the voices of Frenzy, Mudflap and Brains in the Transformers film series. He is also the voice of Sazh Katzroy in Final Fantasy XIII and its sequels, Final Fantasy XIII-2 and Lightning Returns: Final Fantasy XIII.

Personal life
Wilson was born in Brooklyn, New York City. He currently lives in Los Angeles with his wife Coco and two children.

Filmography

Film

Television

Video games

References

External links
 

1969 births
Living people
20th-century American male actors
21st-century American male actors
African-American male actors
American male voice actors
American male film actors
American male television actors
Male actors from New York City
People from Brooklyn
20th-century African-American people
21st-century African-American people